Adam VIII Limited was a record label founded by music publisher Morris Levy, and named after his son Adam. It operated in the late 1960s and 1970s.

Adam VIII specialised in mail order issues and reissues of popular music, including works originally appearing on Roulette Records, also owned by Morris Levy.

The label's reputation suffered greatly from the unauthorised release of Roots, a version of John Lennon's album Rock 'n' Roll. Lennon originally undertook the project as a way to settle a copyright infringement lawsuit, over his song "Come Together", which had borrowed noticeably from Chuck Berry's "You Can't Catch Me" (published by Levy). A planned deal to market the album through Adam VIII turned sour, and Levy released an album pressed from the rough-mix tape Lennon had given him, weeks before the album was finished, then sued Lennon, Capitol Records (Lennon's American label), and EMI. The latter three countersued and won, stopping distribution of Roots and effectively putting Adam VIII out of business.

See also
 List of record labels

Defunct record labels of the United States
Pop record labels